Eilema conspicua is a moth of the subfamily Arctiinae. It was described by Walter Rothschild in 1924. It is found on Madagascar.

Subspecies
Eilema conspicua conspicua
Eilema conspicua monticola Toulgoët, 1954

References

conspicua
Moths described in 1924